The 2015–16 Oral Roberts Golden Eagles women's basketball team represented Oral Roberts University during the 2015–16 NCAA Division I women's basketball season. The Golden Eagles were led by fourth year head coach Misti Cussen and play their home games at the Mabee Center. They were members of The Summit League. They finished the season 14–16, 10–6 in Summit League play to finish in fourth place. They advanced to the semifinals of the Summit League women's tournament, where they lost to South Dakota.

Roster

Schedule

|-
!colspan=9 style="background:#000080; color:#D4AF37;"| Exhibition

|-
!colspan=9 style="background:#000080; color:#D4AF37;"| Non-conference regular season

|-
!colspan=9 style="background:#000080; color:#D4AF37;"| The Summit League regular season

|-
!colspan=9 style="background:#000080; color:#D4AF37;"| The Summit League Women's Tournament

References

See also
2015–16 Oral Roberts Golden Eagles men's basketball team

Oral Roberts Golden Eagles women's basketball seasons
Oral Roberts
Oral
Oral